Embrace Neonatal MRI System is the first FDA-approved MRI device that can be used for head and brain scans of newborns in the NICU. The Embrace system is designed for newborns between 2.2 and 10 pounds and with a head circumference of up to 15 inches. Produced by Aspect Imaging, the Embrace contains a temperature-controlled incubator and does not require that newborns be transported out of the NICU. In case of emergencies, babies can be removed from the system in less than 30 seconds. The device has been installed in the NICU at Shaare Zedek Hospital in Israel as well as at the NICU at Brigham and Women's in the United States.

References 

Magnetic resonance imaging
Neonatology